Bohumil (Boh) Makovsky (September 23, 1878 – June 12, 1950) was a band director and head of the Department of Music at Oklahoma A&M College (now known as Oklahoma State University) from 1915 to 1945. He is considered "the Guiding Spirit" of Kappa Kappa Psi, a national fraternity for college band members. Makovsky was well known for his uncrushed bowtie, early morning band rehearsals, and a pipe in the shape of a saxophone.

Early life
Bohumil Makovsky represented a fulfillment of the "American Dream."  He was born on September 23, 1878 in Františky, Bohemia to a Czech speaking family of Vaclav and Anna Hladik Makovsky. Boh's father died before Boh was born, his mother when he was 12. He had little formal education, and was trained in clarinet and violin by his uncle, Tomas Makovsky, who had once taught a royal family in Russia.  Boh continued living with his older brother on the family estate for another 5 years after his mother's death. Then, in 1895, his older sister, Anna Brdicka, paid his passage to the United States, where she and her husband had settled in Clarkson, Nebraska. He got a job rolling cigars in a local shop.  A short time later, he joined a travelling wagon show that needed a clarinet player, and began his work as a professional musician.

A few years later, Boh formed his own band that entertained all across the midlands. In 1902 Boh's band was contracted for an engagement in Davis, Oklahoma Territory. The group arrived and played their engagement, only to discover that they weren't intending to pay the band. Boh paid his men out of his own pocket and headed for the nearest large town, Oklahoma City. There he gave private music lessons, played in the theater, and directed a concert band in the Delmar Gardens. He had soon started organizing and directing bands in nearby settlements (Woodward, Mustang, Yukon, Prague) which he would then turn over to local directors. In 1910, Boh also started directing the Oklahoma City Metropolitan Band and had a long-standing association with the Oklahoma State Fairs.

While on a family visit to Nebraska, Boh met Georgia Shestack, a fellow Bohemian, whom he married on August 2, 1911.

Oklahoma A&M

In 1915 he was invited by the President of Oklahoma A&M College in Stillwater to become band director and department head. Boh accepted the position, although he had nearly declined it in the face of the required administrative work. Boh started his work here with bands with about 40-50 members who had never had any experience playing in a college setting. As the war ended, veterans returned home, increasing both the size and the quality of Boh's bands.  The OAMC Bands quickly grew as Boh became better at retaining and recruiting members until it had reached over 100 members in 1922. Numbers fell again with the onset of World War II and Boh's own retirement in July 1943.

Awards
Boh was granted the title of Head Emeritus of the Department of Music at OAMC upon his retirement.  He became a naturalized citizen of the United States in May 1921, received an Honorary Doctor of Music Degree from the University of Tulsa, and was elected to Oklahoma's Hall of Fame in 1939, the 1918 "International Who's Who," the 1931 "Musical Who's Who" in the U.S., and the 1935 "Who's Who in Oklahoma."  In 1926 he was elected Grand President of Kappa Kappa Psi, and in 1979, they named an award after him, the Bohumil Makovsky Memorial Award, to recognize outstanding achievement by college band directors.  In 1987, he was posthumously inducted as a charter member of Oklahoma Music Educators Association Hall of Fame, and into the Oklahoma Bandmasters Association Hall of Fame.

Legacy
"Even though Dr. Makovsky accomplished much in his 72 years, he was unfailingly humble and always expressed great appreciation for how much others had done for him. The pipe he smoked, bent into a miniature saxophone shape, and the uncrushed black bow tie which he always wore, became his trademarks.

Boh was stern on the podium and uncompromising in musical detail and interpretation at each of the Monday through Friday 7 a.m. rehearsal hours, yet he was a sincere friend to all. Many were deeply influenced by their contacts with Boh, and his students perpetuate his teachings and ideals this day.

One can thus readily understand that Bohumil Makovsky was a fulfillment of the "American Dream," and by his constant encouragement and support of the Fraternity, was truly, "The Guiding Spirit of Kappa Kappa Psi.""

References 

1878 births
1950 deaths
Oklahoma State University faculty
American bandleaders
University and college band directors
Kappa Kappa Psi founders
People from Stillwater, Oklahoma
Musicians from Oklahoma City
Austro-Hungarian emigrants to the United States